Robert John Quinn (born 8 November 1976) is a former professional footballer, and current youth team coach. He played as midfielder, predominantly in the centre, but also played at centre back. He represented the Republic of Ireland under-21s and Republic of Ireland B team.

Career

Crystal Palace
Quinn began his career at Crystal Palace, where he came through their youth ranks. Whilst he was learning his trade in the Palace youth team, he was made captain and led out the team every week to win the Southeast Counties League. His hard work at youth level was recognised by Crystal Palace manager Dave Bassett, who promoted Quinn to the first team squad. He made his debut, along with youth teammate Danny Boxall, in the last league game of the season in 1996, at home against Norwich City.

Palace made the play-offs and, due to injuries in the first team, Quinn was in the starting line up to face Charlton Athletic in the semi-final, which Crystal Palace won.

Palace were through to the play-off final at Wembley, and due to players still being injured list Quinn was picked to start against Leicester City. Palace lost and were forced to carry on in the First Division for the 1996–97 season, where Quinn was a regular in the team, making 24 appearances and scoring two goals. Later on that season Bassett left and Steve Coppell was brought in, with Quinn falling down the pecking order. Quinn made his first and only appearance in the Premier League on 27 September 1997 in a home match against Bolton, coming on as a substitute after 72 minutes for Kevin Muscat.

Later career
After spells with Brentford, Oxford United, Bristol Rovers and several non-league clubs (most recently AFC Wimbledon and Welling United) he signed with Cray Wanderers for their inaugural season in the Isthmian Premier League for 2009–10. Quinn joined Kent League side Sevenoaks as a player-coach for the 2010–11 season.

Coaching career
, Quinn is a coach at Crystal Palace, with responsibility for the under-18 side, having previously coached the under-16s.

References

External links

Rob Quinn at premierleague.com
Rob Quinn at fai.ie

1976 births
Living people
Footballers from Sidcup
English footballers
Republic of Ireland association footballers
Republic of Ireland B international footballers
Republic of Ireland under-21 international footballers
Association football midfielders
Crystal Palace F.C. players
Brentford F.C. players
Oxford United F.C. players
Bristol Rovers F.C. players
Stevenage F.C. players
Ebbsfleet United F.C. players
AFC Wimbledon players
Welling United F.C. players
Cray Wanderers F.C. players
Sevenoaks Town F.C. players
English Football League players
Premier League players
National League (English football) players
English people of Irish descent
Crystal Palace F.C. non-playing staff